Iantown was the first album to be released under the name The Felice Brothers; however, for the most part, it features only Ian Felice on acoustic guitar and harmonica.

According to the album credits the Iantown was recorded in one evening.

The album was self-released and is now out of print.

Track listing
"You're All Around"
"Devil As A Child"
"The Long Road Ahead"
"In the Arms of Buffalo Bill"
"Her Eyes Dart 'Round"
"Rosie, I'm Wrong"
"Steal A Memory"
"Trouble Been Hard"
"Roll On Arte"
"In My Life"

References

The Felice Brothers albums
2006 albums